Regina "Regi" E. Herzlinger (born c.1944) is an American businessperson and academic. She is the Nancy R. McPherson Professor of Business Administration at Harvard Business School (HBS) where she teaches the Master of Business Administration programme. Herzlinger was the first woman to obtain tenure or become a chair at HBS. She has also been the first woman on several company boards. Her approach has been described as fiscally conservative.

Background
Herzlinger was born Regina Elbinger circa 1944 in Tel Aviv, Israel, to Ella and Alexander Elbinger. Her father was a rabbinical scholar who had fled Russia in the 1920s. Herzlinger's parents then fled Nazi-controlled Germany in 1939 and moved to Israel, where she was born. Her mother was a profitable card player and her father a successful businessman. The Elbingers emigrated to the United States when Regina was eight years old. She grew up in a Jewish community in Crown Heights, Brooklyn, where she attended a small Orthodox yeshiva, graduating in 1961. She was the first girl from her school to leave the community. Herzlinger received a bachelor’s degree in economics from Massachusetts Institute of Technology in 1965. Herzlinger met her future husband, Dr. George Herzlinger, when they were classmates at MIT. They were married in 1966. After graduating from MIT, Herzlinger obtained her Doctor of Business Administration degree from HBS. She began teaching at HBS in 1971. Herzlinger and her husband have two children.

Career
Herzlinger was formerly Senior Fellow at the Manhattan Institute for Policy Research. In 1999, she became the first Chartered Institute of Management Accountants Visiting Professor at the University of Edinburgh.

Alongside her academic career, Herzlinger has served as director or board member of several companies, including: Bard, Cardinal Health, ChemoCentryx, HCR Manor Care, HealthAllies.com, John Deere, Lumenos (now Anthem Inc.), Noven Pharmaceuticals (now Hisamitsu Pharmaceutical), Physicians Interactive, RealMed Corporation, Schering-Plough, Total Renal Care (now DaVita Inc.), and Zimmer Holdings. She also served as a member of the advisory board of KBL Healthcare Ventures. Herzlinger sat on the board of WellCare from 2003 to 2010 where she led the board's audit committee. She resigned in 2010, citing a lack of co-operation from other board members in her efforts to deal with a number of accounting errors.

Herzlinger describes herself as a healthcare "activist" and argues against managed care. She has advised the United States Congress and President George W. Bush on healthcare policy. Herzlinger has served on the Scientific Advisory Group of the United States Secretary of the Air Force. Herzlinger is the author of several best-selling books and has written for The Wall Street Journal and HuffPost. Her book Who Killed Health Care? was recognised by the United States Chamber of Commerce as one of the 10 most influential books in the healthcare debate.

Bibliography
Herzlinger has written several books on healthcare, including:
 Who Killed Health Care? (New York, USA: McGraw-Hill, 2007)
 Consumer-Driven Health Care: Implications for Providers, Payers, and Policymakers (San Francisco, USA: Jossey-Bass, 2004)
 Market-Driven Health Care: Who Wins, Who Loses in the Transformation of America's Largest Service Industry? (Boston, USA: Perseus, 2000)

Awards
Herzlinger has twice received the American College of Healthcare Executives James A. Hamilton Book of the Year Award (1977 and 1998). She has also won the Healthcare Financial Management Association Board of Directors Award. She is an honorary fellow of the American College of Physician Executives. From 2002 to 2005, she was named as one of Modern Healthcare's 100 Most Powerful People in Healthcare.

References

External links
 

MIT School of Humanities, Arts, and Social Sciences alumni
Harvard Business School alumni
Harvard Business School faculty
Date of birth missing (living people)
Manhattan Institute for Policy Research
1940s births
Living people
People from Crown Heights, Brooklyn
American people of Russian-Jewish descent